Wales High School is an academy school for 11- to 19-year-olds, in Kiveton, near Rotherham, South Yorkshire, England.

Opened in 1970, the school provides education for nearby villages, including Kiveton Park, Harthill, Todwick, Wales, Thurcroft and South Anston. The school is situated in Kiveton Park, not in the small neighbouring village of Wales less than a mile away.

The school is a specialist school in Business and Enterprise.

The school was invited to become an academy under new government policy in 2012.

Ofsted inspections
Since the commencement of Ofsted inspections in September 1993, the school has undergone six inspections:

Headteachers
 
Since the school opened in 1970, the headteachers have been:

 Mr Phillip Timothy, September 1970–December 1989
 Mr Lawrence Morton, January 1990–December 2007
 Mr Lawrence Morton (chief executive) and Mr John Day (head of school), January 2008–August 2012
 Mr Lawrence Morton (chief executive) and Mr Giuseppe Di'Iasio (head of school), September 2012–present

Traditions

Sponsored walk: every four years the school holds a sponsored walk with the intention of raising money for the school. Previous walks have contributed to the ongoing improvement of the school environment.
Full school formal assemblies: known as the 'Full School Squash' by pupils and staff, take place four times a year, at Easter, and Christmas, and at the beginning and end of the school year at which the school bell is rung by the youngest pupil/s. Every member of the school is expected to attend. At assemblies special guests are invited, news is given, certificates and awards are presented, and musical items often performed.
Houses and the Dragon: Busli (Blue), Mortain (Black), Rollo (White) and Warenne (Yellow). Busli is named after Roger de Busli and Warenne after William de Warenne, two of William the Conqueror's knights, Mortain after his half-brother, and Rollo was one of his ancestors. Each pupil is assigned a house when joining the school. Pupils are provided with sports kit in their specific house colours, to be worn in P.E. lessons and house sporting events. Houses compete in events such as football, rugby, tennis, cross country and netball, and non-sporting activities such as chess, drama and art. At the end of the year, the house with the most points is awarded the 'Dragon', a golden dragon statue in a glass case. The dragon is engraved with the year and winning house.
Rivalry: Historically, Wales High School has had a rivalry with the nearby Dinnington High School, particularly in sport.

Notable alumni
Dean Downing – racing cyclist, former British National Circuit Race (2002 and 2008) and British National Madison Champion (2003).
Edward Hogg – English actor
Ryan Sampson – TV actor in a 2008 Doctor Who two-part story, and ITV's Roman comedy Plebs

References

External links 
Wales High School

Academies in Rotherham
Educational institutions established in 1970
Secondary schools in Rotherham
1970 establishments in England